"Fair Charlotte" (or "Young Charlotte") (Laws G17) is an American folk ballad.

Story
The story is a cautionary tale concerning a young girl called Charlotte who refused to wrap up warmly to go on a sleigh ride to a New Year's ball. Upon arriving at the ball, her fiancé discovers that she has frozen to death during the journey.

Origins
The ballad of "Fair Charlotte" is based on a poem by Seba Smith that was first published in The Rover, a Maine newspaper, on December 28, 1843, under the title A Corpse Going To A Ball. According to folklorist Phillips Barry, Smith's composition was based on an incident recounted in an 1840 New York Observer article of the same name. The story from the "New York Observer"  was entitled "A Corpse Going To a Ball" and was reprinted in an Ohio Newspaper: "Ohio Democrat and Dover Advertiser" February 28, 1840 p. 1 the article claimed that the incident in question had happened on January 1, 1840; it also claimed that this report was true [yet gave no location of the accident]; likewise it also mentioned at the very beginning a tale called "Death at the Toilet" which in turn came from an 1838 work called "Passages from the Diary of a London Physician". The "Death at the Toilet" told of a vain young woman who was determined to go a ball despite the fact that she suffers from heart problems; because of Cold weather in her room she is found dead at her toilet while primping herself for the ball; the moral of the story is a diatribe against vanity-"...I have seen many hundreds of corpses, as well in the calm composure of natural death, as mangled and distorted by violence;but never have I seen so startling a satire upon human vanity, so repulsive, unsightly, and loathsome a spectacle as a corpse dressed for a ball!." Other Newspapers which reprinted the story were the "Vermont Telegraph" {February 19, 1840 and a follow up article April 1, 1840} and  "Southern Argus" March 3, 1840 of Columbus Mississippi. A version of Smith's poem was subsequently set to music, leading to the creation of the ballad.
During the 20th century, a version of the ballad was sung by Almeda Riddle under the title "Young Carlotta".

See also

 Springfield Mountain, another cautionary folk ballad situated in New England, about a boy who is bitten by a rattlesnake. The two ballads are often cited together as examples of narrative verse representative of obituary tradition.
 Frozen Charlotte, a porcelain doll named after the ballad.

External links
 Text of the Seba Smith poem
 One version of the Fair Charlotte ballad
 Another version of Fair Charlotte collected and originally published in 1924.''

References

American folk songs
Year of song unknown
Songwriter unknown
Urban legends
Folklore
Traditional stories
Songs about fictional female characters